Ptychopyxis is a genus of plant of the family Euphorbiaceae first described in 1861. It is native to Southeast Asia and New Guinea.

Species
 Ptychopyxis arborea - Borneo
 Ptychopyxis bacciformis - Vietnam, Borneo, Sumatra, Philippines, W Malaysia
 Ptychopyxis caput-medusae - W Malaysia
 Ptychopyxis chrysantha - New Guinea
 Ptychopyxis costata - Borneo, Sumatra, W Malaysia
 Ptychopyxis glochidiifolia - Sumatra, Sarawak, Brunei, Kalimantan Timur
 Ptychopyxis grandis - Borneo
 Ptychopyxis javanica - S Thailand, Vietnam, W Malaysia, Borneo, Sumatra, Java
 Ptychopyxis kingii - W Malaysia, E Sumatra, Sarawak, Sabah
 Ptychopyxis plagiocarpa - S Thailand, S Myanmar

formerly included
moved to Koilodepas 
 Ptychopyxis frutescens - Koilodepas frutescens
 Ptychopyxis thwaitesii - Podadenia sapida

References

Pycnocomeae
Euphorbiaceae genera